Chris Swan (born September 24, 1967) is an American former rower.

Biography
Swan hails from Simsbury, Connecticut and is a graduate of Harvard University. He was an alternate for the United States at the 1992 Summer Olympics in Barcelona, not getting a chance to row. At the 1994 World Rowing Championships he was a member of the American team which finished second behind Romania in the coxed four final. He won two medals at the 1995 Pan American Games in Mar Del Plata, a gold in the coxed four and silver in the coxed pair.

References

1967 births
Living people
American male rowers
Pan American Games gold medalists for the United States
Pan American Games silver medalists for the United States
Pan American Games medalists in rowing
World Rowing Championships medalists for the United States
Harvard University alumni
People from Old Saybrook, Connecticut
Sportspeople from Connecticut
Rowers at the 1995 Pan American Games
Medalists at the 1995 Pan American Games